(pronounced ) or  (Swiss spelling, elsewhere used for dialectal ) is the German word describing the amount of beer in a regulation mug, in modern times exactly . This vessel is often referred to as a beer mug by English speakers, and can be correctly called a beer stein only if it is made of stoneware and capable of holding a regulation Maß of beer.

Linguistics
The word "Maß" can be of either neuter or female grammatical gender. In its neuter form, das Maß, it is the German word for "measure". Its feminine version, "die Maß", is used in southern Germany and Austria to refer to a one-litre glass beer mug or its contents. It is spelled  "Maß" or "Mass" (both spellings are permissible) in Germany and Austria, and "Mass" in Switzerland. The plural is also .

A stoneware mug is a form of beer stein, another type of vessel which may only be referred to as a Maßkrug if capable of holding a regulation quantity of beer.

Measurement

In the Southern German areas (Austro-Bavarian), the Maß originally measured . Other German-speaking areas had different measures; in Switzerland between 1838 and 1877, and in Baden until 1871, the Maß was 1.5 litres.

The modern Maßkrug is slightly larger than 1 litre, with a fill line denoting the level to which the beer must be filled; the area above the line denotes space for the head to expand. Selling beer in mugs with a fraudulent or missing calibration mark is also prosecuted as fraud. An "Association Against Fraudulent Pouring [of Beer]" ("Verein gegen betrügerisches Einschenken") in Munich fights for the customer rights of beer drinkers, and is mostly active on Oktoberfest.

Other

Mugs are frequently decorated with a print of the logo of the brewery.

Some beer gardens and restaurants rent space out to patrons to store their mugs, which often have personalized engravings on their lids. For a small monthly fee, the establishment will also wash one's mug.

According to physicist Erich Schuller of the Institute for Forensic Medicine at the Ludwig Maximilian University of Munich, a Maßkrug is an "effective percussion tool" in which each strike is potentially life-threatening. Some cases have occurred, though, in which the Maßkrug yielded. Presumably, these mugs had reduced strength due to wear.

Maßkrugstemmen/Masskrugstemmen/steinholding
The endurance sport of Maßkrugstemmen involves holding a filled  Maß at arm's length. The world record is 45minutes and 2seconds.  While the sport is believed to have originated in Bavaria, Germany, competitions are now seen worldwide. A governing body has been created in the United States as the U.S. Steinholding Association.

See also
Maashaus
Beer glassware
Tankard

References

External links 
 

Beer glassware
German beer culture
Units of volume